Dr. Endre Gáll (16 July 1868 – 10 December 1935) was a Hungarian jurist, who served as Crown Prosecutor of Hungary between 1 October 1934 and 14 June 1935.

Biography
Endre Gáll was born in Nagykőrös on 16 July 1868 into a Calvinist family as the son of vice-notary and archivist Endre Gáll, Sr. (1834–1909) and Judit Ács. His father later became the first President of the Royal Court of Kecskemét and awarded Order of Leopold by Emperor-King Francis Joseph I. Endre, Jr. finished his secondary studies at Piarist gymnasiums of Wiener Neustadt and Kecskemét. He earned his law degree at University of Budapest and Heidelberg University. He became prosecutor in 1898 and relocated to Budapest. He passed bar exam in 1904. He was appointed to the Crown Prosecution of Pest County in 1905.

Gáll served as prosecutor at the trial of the infamous Dános murders from 1907 to 1908. Later he called this role as the "greatest criminal investigation" in his life. In 1915, he was appointed President of the Crown Prosecution of Pest County in 1915. On 1 October 1934, he was appointed Crown Prosecutor by Minister of Justice Andor Lázár, thus also became a member of the House of Magnates. However he soon fell ill and retired on 14 June 1935. He died on 10 December 1935.

References
 
 A magyarországi fő-főügyészek (HVG Archívum)
 Magyar Országos Levéltár

1868 births
1935 deaths
Hungarian jurists
Heidelberg University alumni
People from Nagykőrös